Zvartnots International Airport  is located near Zvartnots,  west of Yerevan, the capital city of Armenia. It acts as the main international airport of Armenia and is Yerevan's main international transport hub. It is the busiest airport in the country.

History
The airport was opened in 1961, and following a design competition held in 1970, M. Khachikyan, A. Tarkhanyan, S. Qalashyan, L. Cherkezyan and M. Baghdasaryan won the right to design the first terminal building. The airport was renovated in the 1980s with the development of a new terminal area, in order to meet domestic traffic demands within the Soviet Union.

When Armenia declared its independence from the Soviet Union in the 1990s, the growth of cargo shipments resulted in the construction of a new cargo terminal in 1998 that can handle about 100,000 tonnes of cargo annually. In 2001, a 30-year concession agreement for the management of operations at the airport was signed with Armenia International Airports CJSC, owned by Argentine company Corporación America, which is in turn owned by Armenian Argentine businessman Eduardo Eurnekian. As part of that agreement, Armenia International Airports CJSC renovated the runway, main taxiways and ramp. In 2006, a new gate area and arrivals hall opened, followed by an overall improvement of the airport's fire services, including replacing the entire fire-fighting fleet with new vehicles. A new departures and arrivals terminal, car-parking facility with a capacity of 600 vehicles and a government delegation terminal all opened in 2011. On 30 January 2013, Zvartnots airport was named "Best Airport In the CIS" during the Emerging Markets Airports Award (EMAA) ceremonies held in Dubai, United Arab Emirates.

Overview
The airport is able to accept aircraft up to and including the Antonov An-225, Boeing 747-400 and Airbus A380. Runway 09 is equipped with an ILS CAT II, which enables aircraft operations in low ceiling (30 meters) and visibility (350 metres).

Zvartnots International Airport recently implemented a new flight information display system (FIDS), a new automated and biometric-identification system for baggage check-in and passenger control, as well as the installation of 150 surveillance cameras across airport premises.

The access to the boarding area is highly secured with three steps, a pre-control, a passport control, and X-ray control. The airport features a Dufry duty-free shop after security, as well as the Converse Bank business class lounge, with a view overlooking the gate area and apron. In addition, the airport features a HayPost office, a pharmacy, several dining options and cafes, a Europcar, Beeline, VivaCell MTS, Ardshinbank, as well as, HSBC, VTB Bank and Ameriabank ATMs.

In December 2019, yearly passenger flow at Zvartnots International Airport exceeded 3 million passengers for the first time in Armenia's history.

Airlines and destinations

Passenger

The following airlines operate regular scheduled and charter services to and from Zvartnots as of 01 January 2023:

Cargo

Traffic and statistics

Annual statistics

Annual passenger numbers

Ground transportation

Bus routes and subway service
In 2017, a new express bus service began operation, with regular round-trips between Zvartnots Airport and downtown Yerevan. The number 201 bus leaves the airport every half hour between 7 AM and 11 PM, and every hour between 12 AM and 6 AM. The travel time is approximately 30 minutes, depending on traffic. Operated by Elitebus, a one-way fare costs 300 AMD. The bus terminus is on Amiryan Street, but the bus also makes stops along Mashtots Avenue, at the Yeritasardakan station (where passengers can connect to the Yerevan Metro system), and at the Republic Square.

Automobile
The airport is accessed from the M5 highway, which connects Yerevan with the west of the country and other major highways. By car, the distance from Zvartnots Airport to the centre of Yerevan is 12 kilometers, taking approximately 20 minutes to get to.

At Zvartnots Airport, cars from car rental companies are available. The airport offers various official parking options, from premium to low cost. In addition, alternative parking options are within the reach of the airport.

Taxi service
In 2019, Zvartnots Airport partnered with Yandex.Taxi to provide passengers with taxi services from the airport.

See also
 Transport in Armenia
 List of the busiest airports in Armenia
 List of the busiest airports in the former USSR
Up-to-date route map of Zvartnots Airport

Notes

References

External links

Airports in Armenia
Airports built in the Soviet Union
Airports established in 1961
Buildings and structures in Armavir Province
Transport in Yerevan
1961 establishments in Armenia